Christian Guillermo Martín Ramos Garagay (born 4 November 1988), known as Christian Ramos, is a Peruvian footballer who plays for César Vallejo and the Peru national team as a centre back.

In May 2018, he was named in Peru's provisional 24 man squad for the 2018 World Cup in Russia.

Club career

Sporting Cristal
He joined Sporting Cristal at the age of 13 but only made his debut for the reserve team in 2007 season. The 2008 season witnessed the rise of Ramos himself, where he played 47 games and was instrumental in guiding Sporting Cristal to the 2009 Copa Libertadores. However, he left the club in 2009 after seeing himself being sidelined.

Universidad de San Martín
Club Deportivo Universidad de San Martín de Porres was his second club in his career, and also where he achieved his height, with USMP won the 2010 season and qualified for the 2011 Copa Libertadores. His performance impressed then-Peru national football team manager Sergio Markarián, allowing him to be summoned to the national team for the first time.

Alianza Lima
The 2011 season saw Ramos signing for his favorite childhood club Alianza Lima, where Ramos was instrumental in helping Alianza Lima to come close for the title, scoring three after 17 games, but his dream crashed when Alianza Lima fell to Juan Aurich in the decisive final series. His performance impressed Argentine and Portuguese clubs, with Ramos almost got the chance, but he lacked necessary documents and thus failed to move abroad.

Juan Aurich
After spending two seasons with Alianza Lima, he moved to the once rival and winner of 2011 final Juan Aurich. As fate would have it, he would again find himself in the decisive finals of the 2014 season, where he again ended up in tear after Juan Aurich fell to his first club Sporting Cristal when Juan Aurich lost 2–3 in the third final. He scored one goal in the first final. He later participated in the 2015 Copa Libertadores, where he demonstrated his performance, notable against Argentine giant and later champions River Plate where he provided a good pass for teammate Marcos Delgado to score in an eventual 1–1 draw in El Monumental.

Club de Gimnasia y Esgrima La Plata
Argentina's Club de Gimnasia y Esgrima La Plata became the first foreign club Christian Ramos played, signing in 2016. He left after just a season in charge.

Emelec
With little opportunity in Argentina, he signed for Ecuadorian giant Emelec as a loan, to replace for Gabriel Achilier who left for Mexico. However, he regained his position and became a frequent starter for the Ecuadorian side, helping the club to reach the round of sixteen in 2017 Copa Libertadores before losing to San Lorenzo de Almagro on penalty. Despite this impressive performance, he left the club by the end of the season.

Veracruz
He joined C.D. Veracruz for the 2018–19 Liga MX season, where he joined compatriots Pedro Gallese, Carlos Cáceda and Wilder Cartagena. But with the club suffering financial turmoil, he left the club by mutual consent.

Al-Nassr
In July 2018, he left Mexico for Saudi Arabia where he signed for Al-Nassr in the Saudi Professional League for the next two seasons with an option to a third year, the transfer was given for 5 million in exchange. However, his performance wasn't impressive, being used only in ten games.

Melgar
He returned to Peru to play for FBC Melgar as a loan from the Saudi club.

Universitario
In summer 2019, he came to play for Universitario de Deportes, where he arrived as a free player. He made his debut for the club facing Los Caimanes in the 2019 Copa Bicentenario, but was given a red card in just 34 minutes in the field. After an unimpressive demonstration in the club, even though the club still wanted him to stay playing, he left by mutual consent after just a season.

Universidad César Vallejo
He signed for Club Deportivo Universidad César Vallejo in late 2019, where he was instrumental, once again, in helping the club to qualify for the 2021 Copa Libertadores.

International career
Before he came to pro in 2008, his talent allowed him to captain the Peru national under-17 football team when the country first hosted the 2005 FIFA U-17 World Cup, also the first youth World Cup Peru participated. He later participated in the 2007 South American U-20 Championship with the Peru national under-20 football team, but not successful.

With these experiences and good performance in club level, he was called up into the national team of Peru, first for the failed 2010 World Cup qualifiers where he debuted against Venezuela in a 1–3 away defeat. He was included in 2011 Copa América, where he played well and helped Peru to obtain third place, even though he only played in three matches. He became a regular member in the country's yet another failed 2014 World Cup qualifiers. He presided over ongoing turmoil of the national team and appeared in a string of friendlies in 2014, where he would score his first international goal against Panama in Lima on 6 August, which Peru won 3–0.

He returned to the national team for the 2015 Copa América, where he only appeared in two games as Peru repeated its 2011 performance to win bronze. He also got into the national team in Copa América Centenario and appeared in all four games. He also got more permanent matches during the 2018 World Cup qualifiers, where he also scored his first goal in an official game, against Paraguay in a 4–1 away victory. His ongoing good form continued throughout the qualification and in the decisive home game playoff against New Zealand, he scored his third and the most important goal in his career, to give Peru a 2–0 win and the country's return to FIFA World Cup after 36 years.

He made into the final 23 in the 2018 FIFA World Cup, appeared in all three group stage games as Peru exited with one win and two defeats.

Honours

Club
Universidad San Martín
Torneo Descentralizado: 2010

Peru
Copa America: Bronze medal 2011, 2015

Career statistics

International

International goals
Scores and results list Peru's goal tally first.

References

External links

1988 births
Living people
Footballers from Lima
Peruvian footballers
Peru international footballers
Peruvian expatriate footballers
Sporting Cristal footballers
Club Deportivo Universidad de San Martín de Porres players
Club Alianza Lima footballers
Juan Aurich footballers
Club de Gimnasia y Esgrima La Plata footballers
C.S. Emelec footballers
Al Nassr FC players
FBC Melgar footballers
Club Universitario de Deportes footballers
Club Deportivo Universidad César Vallejo footballers
Peruvian Primera División players
Argentine Primera División players
Ecuadorian Serie A players
Liga MX players
Saudi Professional League players
2011 Copa América players
2015 Copa América players
Copa América Centenario players
2018 FIFA World Cup players
2021 Copa América players
Association football central defenders
Expatriate footballers in Saudi Arabia
Expatriate footballers in Ecuador
Expatriate footballers in Argentina
Expatriate footballers in Mexico
Peruvian expatriate sportspeople in Ecuador
Peruvian expatriate sportspeople in Argentina
Peruvian expatriate sportspeople in Mexico
Peruvian expatriate sportspeople in Saudi Arabia